Dark Ride may refer to:
 Dark ride, an indoor amusement ride
 Dark Ride (film), a 2006 American horror film
The Dark Ride, an album by Helloween
 "The Dark Ride", a song Gang of Four from Shrinkwrapped